Australia sent a delegation to compete at the 2008 Summer Paralympics in Beijing. The country sent 167 (95 male and 72 female) athletes in 13 sports (out of 20) and 122 officials. It was the country's largest ever Paralympic delegation to an away Games. The team sent to Beijing was described as the emergence of the new generation of Australian athletes with 56 percent of the team attending their first Paralympic Games. The delegation's chef de mission was Darren Peters.

Australia won 23 gold, 29 silver and 27 bronze medals. It finished fourth on the total medal tally and fifth on the gold medal tally.
Major sporting achievements for the Australian team included:
 Matt Cowdrey, an arm amputee swimmer, winning five gold and three silver medals to be the Games' leading athlete.
 Peter Leek, a cerebral palsy swimmer, winning eight medals including three gold.
 Heath Francis, an arm amputee sprinter and Evan O'Hanlon, cerebral palsy sprinter winning three gold medals.
 Kurt Fearnley, a wheelchair racer, winning the marathon for the second time.
 Australian men's wheelchair basketball team winning gold.
 98 Australian athletes won a medal.
 Australian athletes: 21 new world records, 31 Paralympic records, 79 Australian records and 164 personal bests.

Medalists

| width="78%" align="left" valign="top" |

| width="22%" align="left" valign="top" |

Events

Athletics

Jodi Willis-Roberts, Russell Short, and Darren Thrupp competed at their sixth Paralympics. Jessica Gallagher was selected in the team but was classified ineligible to compete. She attended the Games as a member of staff. Australian athletes set six world records, a further three Paralympic records and 16 Australian records during the Games. Heath Francis and Evan O'Hanlon won three gold medals.

Men's track

Men's field

Women's track

Women's field

Coaches – Scott Goodman (Head Coach), Alison O'Riordan, Andrew Dawes, Brett Jones, Louise Sauvage, Iryna Dvoskina, John Minns, John Eden, Alan Makin, Cathy Raha-Lambert

Officials – Gary Lees (Section Manager), Louise Mogg (Section Manager),Andrew Carter, Rowena Toppenberg, Sian Pugh, Mick Jordan, Phil Power, Steve Butler, Stephanie Martin, Jessica Gallagher

Cycling

Included on the Australian team was Michael Milton, a four-time gold medalist as a skier in the Winter Paralympics. Mark le Flohic, gold medalist at the 2000 and 2004 Summer Paralympics, was to take part in the Beijing Games but had to pull out due to injury. Le Flohic broke his collar bone during training one week before the Games were to begin.

Men's road

Men's track

Women's road

Women's track

Coaches – James Victor (Head Coach), Tom Skulander, Paul Martens Officials –   Mark Fulcher (Section Manager), Brett Hidson, Anouska Edwards, Alan Downes, Mark Bullen, Stuart Smith, Murray Lydeamore.

Equestrian

Individual events

Team

* Indicated the three best individual scores that count towards the team total.

Coaches – Mary Longden (Head Coach),David Bowman, Sally Francis Officials –  Ken Dagley (Chef d’Equipe), Doug Denby, Nicola Reynoldson, Michelle Goodrick, Judy Fyfe, Margaret Keyes, Emma Bardot, Ebony Tucker, Terrina Fairbrother, Liz Wright-Smith, Chris Elliott, Carolyn Lieutenant.

Judo

Men

Powerlifting

Men

Women

Coaches – Ray Epstein (Head Coach), Bill Nancarrow

Rowing

Rowing made its debut at the Beijing Games. There were four boat classes which all competed over a distance of 1000m. Australia competed in two of the four rowing events. Australian athletes Kathryn Ross and John Maclean competed in the trunk and arms mixed double skulls.  They won the silver medal, however only missed out on the gold by 0.08 seconds. The gold was won by a crew from China.

Coaches - Pedro Albisser (Head Coach),  Rik Bryan Officials - Adam Horner (Section Manager)

Sailing 

Coaches – Greg Omay (Head Coach), Adrian Finglas Officials – Sarina Macpherson (Section Manager), Linnea Korssell, Sue Crafer, Geoff Milligan, Timothy Lowe

Shooting

Men

Women

Coaches – Miroslav Sipek (Head Coach), Michelle Fletcher Officials – Nick Sullivan (Section Manager), Anne Bugden

Swimming

There were eight men and eleven women making their Paralympic debut. Australia won 9 gold, 11 silver and 9 bronze medals placing it sixth on the swimming medal tally. It was Australia's most successful sport at the Games. Matthew Cowdrey (5 gold and 3 silver) and Peter Leek (3 gold, 4 silver and 1 bronze) were the standout swimmers.

Men

Women

Coaches – Brendan Keogh (Head Coach), Graeme Carroll, Jackie Barck, Amanda Isaac, Jo Love, Rob Moon, Mel Tantrum

Officials – Melanie Jenkins (Section Manager), Jon O'Neill-Shaw, Sandra Eccles, Claire Nichols, Brendan Burkett, Sacha Fulton, Penny Will, Vaughan Nicholson

Table Tennis

Coach – Brian Berry (Head Coach) Official –  Barbara Talbot (Section Manager). Catherine Morrow was selected but withdrew from the team.

Wheelchair Basketball

Men's tournament

Australian men's team known as the 'Rollers' won the gold medal defeating Canada 72–60 in the final
Team roster
Dylan Alcott, Brendan Dowler, Justin Eveson, Michael Hartnett, Adrian King, Tristan Knowles, Grant Mizens, Brad Ness, Shaun Norris, Troy Sachs, Tige Simmons, Brett Stibners
Coaches – Ben Ettridge (Head Coach), Craig Friday Officials – Kelvin Browner (section Manager), Ian Lowther

Group B Matches

Group B Standings

Quarter finals

Semi finals

Gold medal game

Women's tournament

The women's team known as the 'Gliders' won the bronze medal defeating Japan in the playoff.
Team roster
Clare Burzynski, Shelley Chaplin, Cobi Crispin, Melanie Domaschenz, Kylie Gauci, Melanie Hall, Katie Hill, Bridie Kean, Tina McKenzie, Kathleen O'Kelly-Kennedy, Sarah Stewart, Liesl Tesch

Coaches – Gerry Hewson (Head Coach), Mark Hewish

Officials – Sonia Healy (Section Manager), Emma Whiteside.

Group A Standings'

Group A Table

Quarter-finals

Semi-finals

Bronze medal game

Wheelchair Rugby

Representing Australia in wheelchair rugby: 
Men – Bryce Alman, Ryley Batt, Grant Boxall, Shane Brand, Cameron Carr, Nazim Erdem, George Hucks, Steve Porter, Ryan Scott, Greg Smith, Scott Vitale  Coach – Brad Dubberley (Head Coach) Officials – Kim Ellwood (Section Manager), Rob Doidge, Noni Shelton, Angela Mansell

Three of the team made their Paralympic debut and Steve Porter attended his fourth Games. The Australian team known as the 'Steelers' won the silver medal losing to the United States 53–44 in the final.

Group B Standing and Results

 Qualified for quarterfinals
 Eliminated
Source: Paralympic.org

Medal round 

Source: Paralympic.org

Wheelchair Tennis

Men

Women

Coach – Greg Crump (Head Coach) Officials – Geoff Quinlan (Section Manager)

Venues 

There were 19 venues for the Paralympics in Beijing. From this, 18 were used at the Olympics and also in the Paralympic games. Venues were spread throughout three regions in China. “In the construction of the Olympic venues and related facilities, we will give full consideration to the special needs of the athletes and spectators with physical disabilities, to materialize the goal of "equality, participation and sharing"”. When constructing venues for both the Olympic and Paralympic, impediment free designs had to be used to enable access by able and disabled bodies.

Facilities where Australians competed include the Beijing National Stadium (Birds Nest), Beijing National Aquatics Centre (Water Cube), Beijing National Indoor Stadium (Fan) as well as many more.

Venues Designed by Australian Companies 

Many of the venues were designed by Australian companies. One of the iconic venues ‘The Water Cube’, was designed by Australian companies PTW Architects, ARUP Aust., Anti Wave International CSCEC. Other facilities used by for the Paralympics included the Archery, Hockey and Tennis venues which were all designed by Bligh Voller Nield. Many other Australian companies also contributed to the design and building of facilities.

Administration
Athletes and coaches were supported by administrative and sports medicine and science staff.
Administrative staff – Darren Peters (Chef de Mission), Nick Dean (Deputy Chef de Mission), Paul Bird (Chef de Mission), Alison Keys, Jason Hellwig (General Manager), Steve Loader, Michael Hartung, Natalie Jenkins, Caroline Walker, Chris Nunn (Performance Consultant), Jenni Cole, Tony Naar (Chief Information Manager), Graham Cassidy (Media Manager), Margie McDonald, Jordan Baker, Karen Michelmore  Sports medicine and science staff – Larissa Trease, Alison Campbell (Medical Coordinator), Geoff Thompson, Ruben Branson, Sally Heads, John Camens, David Spurrier, Lily Chiu, Richard Bennett, Gary Slater, Jo Vaile

Sponsorship 
“Australia's Paralympic team is funded by the Federal Government but also relies heavily on donations and corporate sponsorship”. The growth of Paralympic sports has grown phenomenally in the past decade however there was concern this didn't translate into increased corporate sponsorship, especially before the 2008 games. Despite this, the Australian Paralympic Committee outlined in their Annual Report for 2007/08 that their corporate sponsorship revenue increased. The revenue for corporate sponsorship was $1.47 million for the year, resulting in a 17.7 per cent increase from the previous year.

Major sponsors 
Telstra was one of many major sponsors at the Beijing Games. Throughout the games, the Australia Paralympic Committee and Telstra created the Telstra HeroMessage program. The program generated 7,000 messages of support that were sent to athletes at the games. The program also ran Chat to a Champ. It allowed students from the Telstra Paralympic Education Program to talk to their Paralympic heroes at the games via the internet.

Toyota was another sponsor for the Paralympic team in Beijing.  Toyota has been supporting the APC for over 12 years (at the time) and through this has been building awareness of the Paralympic movement. They ran multiple promotions in the lead up to the 2008 games. This included developing a media campaign with News Limited and also adding information on Paralympic Games/Athletes to their website.

Beijing Sponsors and Supporters Program (BSSP) 
Representatives from the 25 key sponsors and supporters were sent to Beijing as a part of the BSSP Program. This experience enabled them to see 7 days of the games and witness sports such as swimming cycling, basketball, wheelchair tennis, wheelchair basketball and many more. They also had the chance to tour the Paralympic village, meet the athletes and staff and have an official greeting at the Australian Embassy. “The BSSP enables sponsors and key supporters to experience the Games firsthand and to see the impact of their support on Australia’s Paralympic athletes”.

Toyota Paralympic Talent Search Program 

The Australian Paralympic Committee (APC) runs the Toyota Paralympic Talent Search Program. "Its main goal is to identify people with physical disabilities, vision impairments or intellectual disabilities who display the athletic potential to one day make it to Paralympic level competition". There were 53 athletes from the program who became a part of the Paralympic Preparation Program leading up to the games. From this pool of athletes, 27 where chosen to represent Australia in the 2008 Beijing Paralympic Team. By the end of the games, 15 of those who were selected to be in the team from the Talent Program won medals at their first Paralympic games.

Fundraising 
Since 1990 the Australian Paralympic Committee has been responsible for preparing the Summer and Winter Teams for the Paralympic Games. They also assist athletes to prepare by, "…providing funding for coaching, equipment and travel in the lead up to the…Paralympic Games". Fundraising is an essential avenue for the APC to provide funding for the team. Through various fundraising activities in the lead up to the 2008 games, a $3.11 million gross revenue was made from the 1 October 2007 to the 30 September 2008. This figure beat the target that was set. Revenue of $2.26 million was earned through activities such as raffles, lottery draws and promotional sales. Allsports Direct Australia is a contracted raffle trader and contributed to helping the APC earn the amount fundraised.The APC acknowledges the support from their individual and corporate donors. Almost $850,000 (from the 2007-2008 financial year) from individual and corporate donors went directly to the Beijing Paralympic Team.

Media coverage

Because Australia was sending their largest Paralympic team to the 2008 games, they wanted to make sure that their efforts would be broadcast to Australians. This included putting in place many initiatives to publish, broadcast and promote the games and Paralympic achievements.  In order to distribute content they worked with the Australian Associated Press (AAP), “to maximise distribution of key stories, developing relationships with editors and key journalists, developing a program of events and activities and providing quality background information and stories”. Media Monitors, established there was a total of 31,986 Australian media stories distributed throughout the 2008 Paralympic Games. Online traffic on the APC's website throughout the Beijing Games increased more than 500 percent over Athens and media coverage. The Australian Paralympic Committee reported that there was a 65 per cent increase in Australian media coverage of the Games compared to the 2004 Games in Athens. 
Independent research has also indicated that 64 percent of Australians followed the Beijing Paralympics, which indicates that APC's goal to broadcast the games to Australians over multiple platforms was achieved.

The 2008 Paralympic Games also had television coverage by the Australian Broadcasting Corporation (ABC). The ABC produced the largest, “coverage by an Australian broadcaster in the Paralympic Games history”. There was 40 crew that traveled to Beijing so that the ABC was able to produce more there 120 hours of coverage, including 100 hours which were broadcast live.  It also included daily segments which showed highlights from the games and Australian athlete. The highlights shown at 6pm where, "...pulling in an average audience of over 400,000 viewers".
The coverage of the games was shown over six platforms including television, online and radio. The ABC were, “…awarded Paralympic broadcaster of the year for the Beijing 2008 Paralympic Games”. Australian athlete Gerrard Gosens commented on the television coverage "When I look back to 1996 and the coverage that was there, it was very minimal. Today when you're looking at over 100 hours of ABC television coverage, that really has brought inspiration not only to many Australians, but in particular people who do have a physical disability and looking at the opportunities, not necessarily the obstacles of sport.

Female media coverage 
Inconsistent media coverage between males and females has always been an issue in sport, even in coverage at the Paralympic Games.“In 2007, the Australian government made a pre-election commitment to provide A$1 million to the APC towards the coverage of the 2008 summer and 2010 winter Paralympic Games for the purpose of promoting female participation and role models”. A study conducted for the APC found that the 2008 Beijing Paralympic Games, “…coverage of women at the Games in Australian media was broadly in line with their proportion of the Australian Team (45%) and their total medal success at the Games (37%)”. Women's sport coverage exceeded the media's normal 2 percent allocation of females sport coverage.

See also
 Australia at the Paralympics
 Australia at the 2008 Summer Olympics

References

External links
 Beijing 2008 Paralympic Games Official Site
 International Paralympic Committee Historical Results Database – detailed listing of results
 Australian Paralympic Committee Media Guide Beijing 2008
 "Remarks at the announcement of the Australian 2008 Paralympics Team", official website of the Prime Minister of Australia, 29 July 2008
 "Top 10 Aussies to watch", Daily Telegraph, 4 September 2008

Nations at the 2008 Summer Paralympics
2008
Paralympics